Claudio Tedeschi (born 15 September 1955) is a retired Swiss football defender and later manager.

References

1955 births
Living people
Swiss men's footballers
AC Bellinzona players
FC Lugano players
FC Chiasso players
FC Locarno players
Swiss Super League players
Association football defenders
Swiss football managers
AC Bellinzona managers